Kjølfjellet  is a mountain in the municipality of Ringerike in Buskerud, Norway.

Ringerike (traditional district)
Mountains of Viken